Mikhaylovsky is a rural locality (a settlement) and the administrative center of Mikhaylovskoye Rural Settlement, Paninsky District, Voronezh Oblast, Russia. The population was 675 as of 2010. There are 11 streets.

Geography 
Mikhaylovsky is located 12 km southeast of Panino (the district's administrative centre) by road. Michurinsky is the nearest rural locality.

References 

Rural localities in Paninsky District